The Latvian National Guard or NG (ZS) is a part of the Latvian National Armed Forces. The National Guard is a basic land component, consisting of volunteers who perform traditional national guard duties such as crisis response and support for military operations. It consists of the Staff Headquarters and 4 brigades (formally - regions or novadi), which are divided into 18 battalions. The National Guard continued its development also after Latvia joined NATO.

History 

The National Guard was established on August 23, 1991 by the Supreme Council of the Republic of Latvia as a voluntary public military self-defense organization. Its roots can be traced to the pre-World War II Aizsargi organization. It is the largest NAF structure in terms of numbers. The National Guard has always played an essential role in the national defense system by allowing the public to be involved in national defense. A number of National Guard battalions have been transformed into high-readiness reserve forces, which can be deployed immediately on international military operations.

The youth organization of the National Guard, the Youth Guard (JS), was established in 1992. It is the largest youth movement in Latvia, bringing together young people from the age of 10 to 21.

An aviation component of the National Guard was introduced in 1993, with a fleet of ex-Soviet DOSAAF light aircraft and gliders. In 2000 the aviation component became part of the Air Force.

Mission 
The main task of the National Guard is to support the regular Land Force units by defending the national territory during military threat and to perform NAF combat support and combat logistics functions. At the same time, the National Guard will continue providing assistance to the public regarding crisis control, as well as to the Latvian State Police regarding provision of public law and order, and continue the safeguarding of sites of national security importance.

Structure 

(as of April 20, 2021:)
National Guard (NG) Headquarters (Rīga)
 NG Cyber Defense Unit (Rīga)
 NG special task force 
 NG Special PSYOPS Support Platoon (Valmiera)
 NG Veterans' Union (Rīga)
 Central Band of the National Guard (Rīga)

National Guard 1st Brigade (Rīga HQ):
 NG Student Infantry Battalion (Rīga)
 NG 13th Infantry Battalion (Rīga)
 NG 17th Combat Support Battalion (Mārupe)
 NG 19th Combat Service Support Battalion (Ulbroka)
 NG 53rd Infantry Battalion (Bauska)
 NG CBRN Defense Company (Rīga)

National Guard 2nd Brigade (Valmiera HQ):
 NG 22nd Combat Service Support Battalion (Valmiera)
 NG 25th Infantry Battalion (Gulbene)
 NG 26th Infantry Battalion (Gulbene)
 NG 27th Infantry Battalion (Cēsis)
 NG 31st Infantry Battalion (Alūksne)
 NG 54th Combat Support Battalion (Ogre)

National Guard 3rd Brigade (Rēzekne HQ):
 NG 32nd Infantry Battalion (Rēzekne)
 NG 34th Infantry Battalion (Daugavpils)
 NG 35th Infantry Battalion (Preiļi)
 NG 36th Combat Support Battalion (Lūznava)
 NG 55th Infantry Battalion (Aizkraukle)
 NG 56th Combat Service Support Battalion (Jēkabpils)

National Guard 4th Brigade (Liepāja HQ):
 NG 44th Infantry Battalion (Liepāja)
 NG 45th Combat Service Support Battalion (Kuldīga)
 NG 46th Infantry Battalion (Ventspils)
 NG 51st Infantry Battalion (Dobele)
 NG 52nd Combat Support Battalion (Jelgava)

Equipment

Weapons

Military vehicles

Cooperation 

The National Guard has established close co-operation with similar organizations abroad – the US Michigan Army National Guard, the Australian Army Reserve, the UK Territorial Army, and the Home Guard organizations of Denmark, Sweden, Norway, Lithuania and Estonia.

Gallery

References

External links

Latvian National Guard Official Website 

Military of Latvia
Militias in Europe
Military units and formations established in 1991
1991 establishments in Latvia